Events from the year 1945 in Canada.

Incumbents

Crown 
 Monarch – George VI

Federal government 
 Governor General – Alexander Cambridge, 1st Earl of Athlone
 Prime Minister – William Lyon Mackenzie King
 Chief Justice – Thibaudeau Rinfret (Quebec) 
 Parliament – 19th (until 16 April) then 20th (from 6 September)

Provincial governments

Lieutenant governors 
Lieutenant Governor of Alberta – John C. Bowen   
Lieutenant Governor of British Columbia – William Culham Woodward 
Lieutenant Governor of Manitoba – Roland Fairbairn McWilliams  
Lieutenant Governor of New Brunswick – William George Clark (until November 1) then David Laurence MacLaren 
Lieutenant Governor of Nova Scotia – Henry Ernest Kendall 
Lieutenant Governor of Ontario – Albert Edward Matthews 
Lieutenant Governor of Prince Edward Island – Bradford William LePage (until May 18) then Joseph Alphonsus Bernard 
Lieutenant Governor of Quebec – Eugène Fiset 
Lieutenant Governor of Saskatchewan – Archibald P. McNab (until February 27) then Thomas Miller (February 27 to June 20) then Reginald John Marsden Parker (from June 22)

Premiers 
Premier of Alberta – Ernest Manning   
Premier of British Columbia – John Hart  
Premier of Manitoba – Stuart Garson  
Premier of New Brunswick – John McNair 
Premier of Nova Scotia – A.S. MacMillan (until September 8) then Angus Macdonald 
Premier of Ontario – George A. Drew 
Premier of Prince Edward Island – J. Walter Jones  
Premier of Quebec – Maurice Duplessis 
Premier of Saskatchewan – Tommy Douglas

Territorial governments

Commissioners 
 Controller of Yukon – George A. Jeckell 
 Commissioner of Northwest Territories – Charles Camsell

Events

 1944–1945: World War II: Japan's Special Balloon Regiment launched 9,000 Fu-Go balloon bombs towards the Pacific Northwest, intended to cause panic, by starting forest fires. Six casualties, a woman and her five children in American state of Oregon, were reported. The ten metre-wide balloons contained 540 cubic metres of hydrogen and reached as far inland as Manitoba. The Japanese project was declared a failure and abandoned, after six months.
 January 8 – Brantford, Ontario becomes the first Canadian community to fluoridate its water supply.
 January 20 – World War II: The  first conscripted Canadian soldiers arrive overseas
 February 8 – World War II: The Anglo-Canadian Operation Veritable launched in the Netherlands
 February 24 – Radio Canada International begins operation
 February 25 – Sergeant Aubrey Cosens posthumously awarded the Victoria Cross
 March 1 – Major Frederick Albert Tilston wins the Victoria Cross
 March 29 – The British Commonwealth Air Training Plan is shut down
 May 7 – The crew of  vote themselves out of the Pacific war
 May 8 – VE Day sees celebrations across the nation, but also the Halifax Riot.
 June 4 – 1945 Ontario general election: George Drew's PCs win a majority

 June 11 – Federal election: Mackenzie King's Liberals win a third consecutive majority
 June 26 – Canada is a founding member of the United Nations
 August 2 – The Canadian Armoured Corps becomes the Royal Canadian Armoured Corps
 August 15 – VJ Day marks the end of the Second World War. Over a million Canadians had fought in the conflict and 42,000 were killed.
 September 5 – The defection of Soviet embassy clerk Igor Gouzenko reveals a Soviet spy ring in Canada.
 September 8 – Angus Macdonald becomes premier of Nova Scotia for the second time, replacing Alexander MacMillan
 September 12 – The Ford Motor employees in Windsor, Ontario, go on strike.
 October 23 – Jackie Robinson signs a contract with the Montreal Royals baseball team.

Full date unknown
 Family allowance payments are introduced.
 Canada has its first trade surplus with the United States.

Arts and literature
 The Tin Flute (Bonheur d'occasion) by Gabrielle Roy.

Sport
 February 25 – Maurice Richard sets a new record for the most goals (50) in a single ice hockey season.
 April 22 – The Toronto Maple Leafs win their fifth Stanley Cup by defeating the Detroit Red Wings 4 games to 3. 
 April 23 – The Ontario Hockey Association's Toronto St. Michael's Majors win their second Memorial Cup by defeating the Southern Saskatchewan Junior Hockey League's Moose Jaw Canucks 4 games to 1. All games were played at Maple Leaf Gardens in Toronto
 September 29 – The Calgary Stampeders are established 
 December 1 – The Toronto Argonauts win their sixth Grey Cup by defeating the Winnipeg Blue Bombers 35 to 0 in the 33rd Grey Cup played in Varsity Stadium in Toronto.

Births

January to March

 January 15 - Bonnie Burnard, novelist (d. 2017)
 January 18 - Steven Truscott, exonerated murderer
 January 21 - Len Derkach, politician
 January 23 - Mike Harris, politician and 22nd Premier of Ontario
 January 27 
 Harold Cardinal, writer, political leader, teacher, negotiator and lawyer (d. 2005)
 Joe Ghiz, politician and 29th Premier of Prince Edward Island (d. 1996)
 February 5 - Nancy McCredie, track and field athlete
 February 19 
 Jim Bradley, politician
 Bill Casey, politician
 February 20 - Donald McPherson, figure skater (d. 2001)
 March 4 - Patrick Boyer, politician and university professor
 March 6 - John A. MacNaughton, financier and executive (d. 2013)
 March 17 - Dave Bailey, track and field athlete (d. 2022)
 March 26 - Diane McGifford, politician
 March 28 - Bobby Schmautz, ice hockey player (d. 2021)

April to June
 April 24 - Doug Riley, Canadian keyboard player and producer  (d. 2007)
 May 3  – Leo Panitch, political scientist (d. 2020)
 May 27 - Bruce Cockburn, folk/rock guitarist and singer-songwriter
 June 11 - Robert Munsch, children's writer
 June 16 - Lucienne Robillard, politician and minister
 June 20 - Anne Murray, singer

July to September

 August 4 - Ben Sveinson, politician
 August 11 - David Walsh, businessman, disgraced head of Bre-X (d. 1998)
 August 12 - Mary Stewart, swimmer and world record breaker
 August 15 - Rosann Wowchuk, politician and Deputy Premier of Manitoba
 September 21 - Bjarni Tryggvason, engineer and astronaut (d. 2022)

October to December
 October 15 - John Murrell, playwright (d. 2019)
 November 5 - Jacques Lanctôt, member of the Front de libération du Québec (FLQ)
 November 11 - Norman Doyle, politician
 November 12 - Neil Young, singer-songwriter, musician and film director
 December 4 - Roberta Bondar, neurologist and Canada's first female astronaut
 December 24 - John Till, musician (d. 2022)

Full date unknown
 Felix Partz, artist and co-founder of the artistic collective General Idea (d. 1994)

Deaths
 January 15 – Kate Simpson Hayes, playwright and legislative librarian (b. 1856)
 March 2 - Emily Carr, artist and writer (b. 1871)
 March 23 - Walter Charles Murray, first President of the University of Saskatchewan (b. 1866)
 July 17 - Adjutor Rivard, lawyer, writer, judge and linguist (b. 1868)
 October 24 - Franklin Carmichael, painter and Group of Seven member (b. 1890)
 November 1 - Marie Lacoste Gérin-Lajoie, feminist and social activist (b. 1867)
 December 10 - Joseph-Octave Samson, businessperson, politician and 28th Mayor of Quebec City (b. 1862)

See also
 List of Canadian films

Historical documents
Platoon leader in 48th Highlanders of Canada describes Battle of Apeldoorn in Netherlands

"A zest to life she has never felt before" - Manitoban nurses "tigers" of 1st Canadian Division in Italy

Food shortage in occupied France, especially in cities but benefiting farmers, accompanied after liberation by high inflation

Winter 1945 is trying for Canadian diplomats Charles Ritchie and Saul Rae and family, living in liberated Paris without fuel

Print: For European children dying of cold and hunger at Christmas

Record of two British mariners killed on Canadian cargo ship sunk in Scottish waters in war's last U-boat attack

Film: newsreel shows U-boats surrendering in North American waters, including off Shelburne, Nova Scotia

"A despondent-looking mob" - Canadian Parachute Battalion finds German soldiers and families eagerly surrender to avoid Russians

"My survival was an absolute miracle" - 14-year-old orphan liberated from Buchenwald concentration camp

Hundreds of children freed from Buchenwald, where several Polish inmates ran school

Agreement on trials of European war criminals, who will return "to the countries in which their abominable deeds were done"

"That vague expression and pose of utter bewilderment" - war artist's painting of lone survivor of bomber crash

Royal Navy electrician posted to Quebec City makes substantial extra pay playing trumpet in Al Bedard's band

War artist Lance-Corporal Molly Lamb's humorous graphic story of saying goodbye to her CWAC comrades

"A friend to the service man and his dependents at home" - New Brunswick MP's election campaign flyer is aimed at military voters

Black Canadian Army private goes to City Hall to challenge segregation policy in four Glasgow dance halls

Returning veterans should have houses and suits, but souvenir firearms are not encouraged

Poster: Information on Canadian production and fighting in later war period

British PM Clement Attlee says farm, factory and shipyard workers, scientists, technicians and research workers share credit for victory

"A steadfast and progressive people, blessed with a bountiful land" - production of energy and farm products in wartime Alberta

To block inflation, Canadians urged to avoid black markets, keep to price controls and "not buy two where one will do"

Discussion guide on women's war effort and future role of women in workplace, home and community

Postwar hurdles that Canadians face and need to discuss include too few people, too little independence, and disunity

Editorial speculates on "Japanese mind" in assessing Japan's crimes, "which no Japanese wants to hear about today"

Protests against transfer of more than half of Japanese Canadians to Japan, with calls for their rehabilitation and rights restoration

PM King explains proposal for peace and security organization (UN), and how it would improve on League of Nations

"Trust the people as to the future" - King believes putting war and UN conference above politics will aid Liberals' re-election

On way to UN conference, diplomat Charles Ritchie labels PM King "the fat little conjurer with his flickering, shifty eyes"

Canadians seek standing equal to their role in victory, but U.S. diplomat says cooperation among four major Allies is complex enough

U.S.A., U.K. and Canada intend to share non-military atomic research with all nations for "an atmosphere of reciprocal confidence"

Soviet embassy clerk Igor Gouzenko defects, "sickened by the evidence of intrigues and espionage directed against Canada"

Film: newsreel of Russian espionage case with shots of Deep River, Ontario "atom bomb plant" and many Mounties

U.S. State Department briefing paper on Britain's (and specifically Churchill's) lack of control over Commonwealth nations

"Anglophobia" in U.S.A. targets U.K. (and Canada, as still part of Empire), hampering postwar economic settlement

Private cars, buses and trucks seized for enormous roadblock during strike by Ford of Canada workers in Windsor, Ont.

Program of Oscar Peterson Trio concert includes works by Chopin, Kreisler, Dvorak, Gershwin, Ellington and Peterson

References

 
Years of the 20th century in Canada
Canada
1945 in North America